Kaytanak is a rural locality (a selo) in Ust-Koksinsky District, the Altai Republic, Russia. The population was 337 as of 2016. There are 4 streets.

Geography 
Kaytanak is located 21 km southwest of Ust-Koksa (the district's administrative centre) by road. Maralovodka is the nearest rural locality.

References 

Rural localities in Ust-Koksinsky District